Gloria Alcorta (1915-2012) was an Argentine writer, poet and sculptor.

Her first work was a books of poems in French titled La Prison de l'enfant, it was published in 1935 and it has a preface by Jorge Luis Borges.

She was the daughter of Rodolfo Alcorta.

1915 births
2012 deaths
Argentine women poets
20th-century Argentine women writers
20th-century Argentine writers